Murrell's Row was a red-light district of Atlanta "starting at the juncture of Line, Decatur and Peachtree streets" (i.e. at today's Five Points "and running back towards Pryor on Decatur street". According to Archival Atlanta:
Named for the notorious Tennessee murderer, John A. Murrell, this section of town was a favorite hangout for thieves, gamblers, cutthroats, and prostitutes. Drunken brawls and cockfights were common and expected here. Before the Civil War, Murrell’s Row was the preferred meeting place for those who wanted to fight and concoct schemes. This notorious area north of Decatur Street between Peachtree and Pryor faded away shortly before the Civil War.

References

External Resources
Pecanne Log (blog), "Breaking News: Atlanta's Seedy Past"

Former neighborhoods of Atlanta
Historical red-light districts in the United States

History of Atlanta